The Vans Warped Tour was a summer music and extreme sports festival that toured annually from 1995 to 2019. The following is a comprehensive list of bands that performed on the tour throughout its history.

References
Citations

Sources

 
 
 

Warped Tour Band attendance by year
Warped Tours